Bad Men of the Border is a 1945 American Western film directed by Wallace Fox and written by Adele Buffington. The film stars Kirby Grant, Fuzzy Knight, Armida, John Eldredge, Barbara Sears and Edward Howard. The film was released on September 28, 1945, by Universal Pictures.

Plot

Cast        
Kirby Grant as Ted Cameron
Fuzzy Knight as Mortimer P. 'Rockabye' Jones
Armida as Dolores Mendoza
John Eldredge as Bart Breslow
Barbara Sears as Marie Manning
Edward Howard as Ace Morgan 
Francis McDonald as Capt. Jose Garcia
Soledad Jiménez as Estrella

References

External links
 

1945 films
American Western (genre) films
1945 Western (genre) films
Universal Pictures films
Films directed by Wallace Fox
American black-and-white films
1940s English-language films
1940s American films